Eupatoriastrum is a genus of flowering plants in the family Asteraceae. It is native to Mexico and Central America (and found in Costa Rica, El Salvador, Guatemala, Honduras, and Nicaragua).

The genus is named for Mithridates Eupator, king of Pontus.

The genus has been verified by the United States Department of Agriculture and the Agricultural Research Service, but it does not list any species.

Species
As accepted by Plants of the World Online;
 Eupatoriastrum angulifolium 
 Eupatoriastrum chlorostylum 
 Eupatoriastrum corvi 
 Eupatoriastrum johnbeamanii 
 Eupatoriastrum nelsonii 
 Eupatoriastrum pochutlanum 
 Eupatoriastrum triangulare

References

Other sources
 Turner, B. L. 1994. Systematic study of the genus Eupatoriastrum (Asteraceae, Eupatorieae). Pl. Syst. Evol. 190:113-127.

Eupatorieae
Flora of Mexico
Flora of Central America
Asteraceae genera